Francesco Zucchi (Venice, 1692–1764), was an Italian engraver, active mainly in Northern Italy.

Biography
He was the brother of Andrea Zucchi (1679–1740), and was instructed by him in Pordenone. He is also described as close to Pietro Scalvini.

He was invited to Dresden to engrave some plates from the pictures in the Gallery but his work was interrupted by the Seven Years' War. According to Henry Fuseli, Zucchi never actually went to Dresden but he was sending his works from Venice instead. His artistic production includes reproductions of paintings, city views of Venice, Brescia, Brixen (Bressanone) and many illustrations for books including the 1742 Italian translation of the Paradise Lost by Milton. He died in 1764.

References

Attribution:

External links 

1690s births
1764 deaths
Italian engravers